Steam gun boats (SGBs) were small Royal Navy vessels built from 1940 to 1942 for Coastal Forces during the Second World War. The class consisted of nine steam-powered torpedo boats.

They were developed in parallel with the 35-metre long Fairmile D motor torpedo boats ("dog boats"), specifically due to the need to hunt down German E-boats at a time of scarcity of suitable diesel engines. While sixty were planned, only an initial batch of nine were ordered on 8 November 1940, of which seven were completed.

Design
The steam gun boats were conceived to answer the seeming need for a craft which was large enough to put to sea in rough weather and which could operate both as a "super-gunboat" and a torpedo carrier, combining the functions of the motor gunboat (MGB) and motor torpedo boat (MTB) in the same fashion as did the German E-boats. The Admiralty wanted Denny to produce a design that was suitable for pre-fabrication construction to enable large numbers to be built.

They were the largest of the Coastal Forces vessels, and were the only ones to be built of steel (to meet the fast production requirement – all other Coastal Forces craft were of wood). They resembled a miniature destroyer, and were perhaps the most graceful of all the craft produced during the Second World War. However their comparatively large silhouette was a drawback, making them too easy a target for the faster German craft.

They were powered by two 4,000 hp steam turbines using special LaMont boilers. These boilers proved to be particularly vulnerable to attack and – once the vessel had broken down – required a major effort to repair. Steam had the advantage of quietness but demanded a large hull. Large wooden hulls were not feasible for mass production, so steel was used. This meant hulls and machinery were beyond the scope of the small yards engaged in the rapid expansion of the coastal forces, and the SGB thus competed for berths in yards already hard put to produce urgently required convoy escorts. Also they competed in the demand for mild steel and steam power plants against the more urgently demanded destroyers; accordingly the planned 51 further vessels were not ordered, and the two units ordered from Thornycroft were not completed after air-raid damage. The seven vessels constructed were built by Yarrow, Hawthorn Leslie, J. Samuel White and William Denny and Brothers, entering service by the middle of 1942.

Fuel consumption was heavy. A disadvantage was that, while a petrol boat could start from cold and get away immediately, the SGB had to remain in steam. Over time the addition of 18 mm (0.7 in) protective plate over the sides of the boiler and engine rooms, together with the extra armament and crew, increased the displacement to 260 tons and their service speed was consequentially reduced to 30 knots.

Veritable battleships of the coastal forces, the steam gun boats were heavily armed and could maintain high speed in a seaway. In action E-boat commanders respected the SGBs almost as much as destroyers as a single well-placed shot from their three-inch guns could disable or sink an E-boat.

Their armament was arranged with the three-inch gun on the aft deck behind the superstructure, just aft of the torpedo tubes that angled out on either side of the superstructure. There were a pair of (57 mm) six-pounder guns fore and aft, and two twin Oerlikon 20 mm cannons, one in the apex of the bow and one on the stern superfiring over the three-inch gun. Machine guns were mounted in twin mounts on either side of the bridge.

The nearest Kriegsmarine parallel to these was the R-301 class of R boats. Although these 160-ton vessels were designed as minesweepers-minelayers, this class was unique in being equipped with two torpedo tubes and sometimes an 88 mm gun, as well as the typical R boat armament of 37 mm and 20 mm guns and 16 mines. These were usually called "escort minesweepers". They were slightly slower than the steam gun boats.

Service
A lack of steel and turbines meant that the 52 boats initially planned were reduced to an order of nine boats which received the designations SGB 1 to 9. Numbers 1 and 2 were cancelled when their hulls were badly damaged by an air raid on the Southampton area. The 1st SGB Flotilla was formed at Portsmouth by mid-June 1942, under the command of Lieutenant-Commander Peter Scott, son of the Antarctic explorer Captain Robert Scott, later a noted ornithologist, conservationist and broadcaster. Their first fleet action took place in the Baie de Seine (the estuary of the Seine River) shortly after midnight on 19 June, when two vessels – SGB 7 and 8 – under the joint command of Lieutenant J. D. Ritchie, in company with the  Albrighton encountered several E-boats escorting two German merchantmen. SGB 7 was sunk in this action; as a consequence the Admiralty noted their vulnerability and refitted them with additional armour over their engine and boiler rooms. At the same time the six remaining boats were renamed after wildlife in the form "SGB Grey....".

Grey Owl was damaged in a fight with German armed trawlers off Berneval while escorting landing craft in the Dieppe Raid August 1942.

Ships in class 
The nine vessels laid down, listed below, were all ordered on 8 November 1940.

These boats formed the 1st SGB Flotilla which was initially formed at Portsmouth, but later based at HMS Aggressive, Newhaven, Sussex on the south coast of England.

SGB5 was damaged in the Dieppe raid after meeting a German convoy of R boats. In 1944 the six survivors were all converted to fast minesweepers and all except SGB9, Grey Goose, were sold off in the years after the war.

SGB9 remained in service as a propulsion trials vessel from 1952 to 1956, her steam engines replaced by Vospers with a pair of experimental Rolls-Royce RM60 gas turbines, becoming the first vessel so powered. The highly advanced turbines featured intercooled compressors and recuperators to boost turbine power output and reduce fuel consumption. The gas turbine powerplant provided 35% more power while weighing 50% less and was 25% less bulky, compared with the original steam machinery. Although the experimental powerplant proved very successful, it was too complex and supporting technology too immature for wider service at that time, and SGB9 was placed in reserve at the end of the trials in 1957.  With the experimental engines removed, SGB9 was sold off in 1958, becoming a mercantile repair hulk. Sold in 1984, the hulk was converted to a houseboat and renamed Anserava. As of 2020 she was moored on the River Medway near Hoo St Werburgh in Kent, England.

References

Notes

Bibliography
The Encyclopedia of Weapons of World War II by Chris Bishop, 2002 
Coastal Forces SGBs at unithistories.com accessed 11 December 2007
David K. Brown, The Design and Construction of British Warships 1939–1945, Volume 3, Conway Maritime Press, .
Konstam, Angus British Motor Gun Boat 1939-45 2010 Osprey Publishing . 978 1 84908 077 4
George L Moore, The Steam Gunboats – in Warship 1999–2000, Conways Maritime Press, .

External links
 Photographs of SGB3 Grey Seal, SGB4 Grey Fox and SGB5 Grey Owl
 2006 photograph of SGB9 Grey Goose
 Archival newsreel footage of SGB9 turbine trials

Gunboats of the Royal Navy
Steamboats in Europe